Cossacks Go ((Kozaki ydut) is a 1991 Ukrainian adventure film directed by Serhiy Omelchuk.

Plot 
Ukraine-Russia of the end of the XV century. Suddenly, all the gunpowder made at the manufactories disappears. The Cossacks, led by Maxim Trituz, gather together to find one of the convoys carrying gunpowder in January.

Cast
Mykhailo Holubovych as Maksym Trytuz
Inna Kapinos as Nastka
Les Zadniprovskyi as Stas Malchevsky
Yuri Muravytsky as Jesuit
Yuri Mazhuha as Som
Oleg Maslennikov as Overko
Andryi Borysenko as Talamara
olexandr Lytovchenko as Ivan Spudey

References

External links

Movie on imdb

1991 films
1990s historical adventure films
Ukrainian historical adventure films
Ukrainian-language films